Sektor Gaza (translated as Gas Sector) was a Soviet and Russian punk rock band from Voronezh, founded in 1987 by Yuri Klinskikh.

History 
Sektor Gaza was founded in Voronezh by Yuri Klinskikh, also known as Yuri "Khoy". The group is named after an industrial district of Voronezh nicknamed Sektor Gaza due to its high levels of environmental contamination (also corresponds to the Russian name of Gaza Strip). Sektor Gaza's first performance as a group occurred at the local rock club on 9 June 1988, but the group's official date of establishment is traditionally given as 5 December 1987, the date of Klinskikh's first solo performance of material from Sektor Gaza's future repertoire at the Voronezh Rock Club.

In 1989, the group recorded the demo tapes Plugi-vugi and Kolkhozny pank.

In 1990, the group recorded the albums Zloveshchiye Mertvetsy and Yadryona Vosh in a professional recording studio in Voronezh. Klinskikh sold his motorcycle in order to afford to rent the studio.

In 1991, Sektor Gaza made their television debut, appearing on the programs 50x50 and Programma A on the Central Television of the USSR. The music video for "Kolkhozny pank" was shown on the youth program Do 16 i starshe..., contributing to the group's fame across the country. In the same year, the group recorded the album Noch pered Rozhdestvom at the Mir studio in Moscow and rerecorded the album Kolkhozny pank at Gala Records.

In 1992, Sektor Gaza released their sixth studio album, Gulyay, muzhik! and toured extensively.

In 1993, the group released Nazhmi na gaz.

In 1994, Sektor Gaza released Kashchey Bessmertny, a punk-opera based on the famous Russian folklore figure. On this album, Klinskikh performed original lyrics to the melodies of songs by groups such as AC/DC, Queen, Ace of Base, and Nirvana. The album ranked in the top 10, and journalists called Sektor Gaza "a young promising group from the back of beyond".

In 1995, the group performed at the Rock Summer festival in Tallinn. They also toured Germany and Israel and performed at the Gorbunov Palace of Culture.

In 1996, Sektor Gaza released Gazovaya Ataka, which marked a change in the group's style and a move away from obscene lyrics. The music video for the track "Tuman" off this album made it into the rotation of many Russian television channels.

In 1997, the group released Narcologichesky Universitet Millionov. The song "Pora domoy" from this album became a hit.

In the summer of 1998, Klinskikh and Aleksey Bryantsev (DJ Krot) arranged some Sektor Gaza songs as techno remixes, which were released on the album Extasy in 1999. In November 1998, Sektor Gaza toured Russia.

In October 2000, the group released a new album, Vosstavshy iz Ada. Klinskikh's health was in decline due to liver disease. On 4 July 2000, Klinskikh complained of strong pains in his stomach and the left side of his chest. He chose not to cancel a meeting later that day to film a music video for the song "Noch Strakha". He suffered heart failure shortly thereafter. Klinskikh died in Voronezh at the age of 35. He is buried in the Levoberezhnoye Cemetery.

Discography

Demo albums 
 1989: Плуги-вуги (Plows-woogie)
 1989: Колхозный Панк (Kolkhoz Punk)

Studio albums 
 1990: Зловещие Мертвецы (The Evil Dead)
 1990: Ядрёна Вошь (Vigorous Louse)
 1991: Ночь перед Рождеством (The Night before Christmas)
 1991: Колхозный Панк (Kolkhoz Punk)
 1992: Гуляй, мужик! (Make Merry, Man!)
 1993: Нажми на Газ (Hit The Gas)
 1993: Сектор Газа (Gas Sector or Gaza Strip)
 1994: Танцы после Порева (Dancing after Sex)
 1994: Кащей Бессмертный (Kashchey The Immortal)
 1996: Газовая Атака (Gas Attack)
 1997: Наркологический Университет Миллионов (Narcological University for Millions)
 1997: Сектор Газа (Gas Sector or Gaza Strip) 
 2000: Восставший из Ада (Hellraiser'')

Compilations and remixes 
 1996: Избранное I (Best of I)
 1996: Избранное II (Best of II)
 1998: Баллады (Ballads)—contains calm rock ballads
 1999: Extasy—Techno-style remixes by Aleksey Bryantsev (DJ Krot)
 1999: Extasy 2—Techno-style remixes by Aleksey Bryantsev (DJ Krot)
 2002: Избранное III (Best of III)
 2003: Баллады II (Ballads II)
 2015: Вой на Луну (Howl at the Moon)

Vinyl releases 
 1991: Колхозный панк (Kolkhoz Punk)
 1993: Нажми на газ (Hit The Gas)

Music videos 
 1992: Колхозный панк (Kolhoz Punk)
 1993: Лирика (Lyric)
 1996: Туман (Fog)
 1999: Пора домой (Time to go home)
 2000: Ночь страха (Fright Night) [completed by the fans in 2013]

Band members 
 Yuri "Khoy" Klinskikh – vocal, texts, music – 1987–2000
 Oleg Kryuchkov – drums – 1988–1990
 Semen Titievsky – bass – 1988–1991
 Igor Kuschev – guitar – 1989–1991
 Sergei Tupikin – guitar, bass – 1989–1993
 Aleksey Ushakov – keyboards – 1989–1995
 Alexandr Yakushev – drums  – 1989–1998
 Tatiana Fateeva  – vocal – 1990–1993
 Vladimir Lobanov – guitar (on concerts only) – 1991–1993
 Igor "Egor" Zhirnov (Chernyi obelisk, Rondo) – guitar (on albums only) 1991–2000
 Vitaly Suchkov – bass (on concerts only) – 1993
 Vadim Gluhov – guitar (on concerts only) – 1993–2000
 Irina Puhonina – vocal (on albums only) – 1994, 1996
 Vasily Chernykh – guitar (on concerts only) – 1995–1998
 Igor Anikeev – keyboards – 1995–2000
 Elbrus Cherkezov – bass (on album only) – 1997
 Valery Podzorov – bass (on concerts only) – 1997–1998
 Veronika Nekiforova – vocal (on album only) – 1998
 Vasily Dronov – bass (on album only) – 2000

See also 
 Yuri Klinskikh
 Krasnaya Plesen

Explanatory notes

References

External links 
 Sektor Gaza's information in Russmus.net
 
 Sektor Gaza Fan Club International
 Sektor Gaza on the InterneT!
 Russian Sektor Gaza portal
 Sektor Gasa Musik

1980s in music
1990s in music
Horror punk groups
Musical groups disestablished in 2000
Musical groups established in 1987
Russian punk rock groups
Soviet punk rock groups